Project Mars: A Technical Tale is a 2006 science fiction novel by German-American rocket physicist, Wernher von Braun (1912–1977), credited as Dr. Wernher von Braun. It was written by von Braun in German in 1949 and entitled Marsprojekt. Henry J. White (1892–1962) translated the book into English and it was published later by Apogee Books (Canada) in 2006 as Project Mars: A Technical Tale, almost thirty years after von Braun's death. The original German text remains unpublished.

The novel set in the 1980s and is about the first human mission to Mars and their encounter with benevolent Martians on the planet. While the book was not published for 57 years, its appendix, a technical specification for an expedition to Mars was published in English in 1953 by the University of Illinois Press as The Mars Project.

Background

Von Braun wrote Marsprojekt, a science fiction novel in German between 1948 and 1949 while stationed at the U.S. Army's rocket research facility at Fort Bliss in New Mexico. It was translated into English as Mars Project by Lieutenant Commander Henry J. White of the United States Navy and cleared for publication by the U.S. Defense Department in early 1950. The DoD felt that von Braun's visions of space travel were "too futuristic to infringe on classified matters". Von Braun submitted the English manuscript to eighteen US publishers, but it was rejected by all of them.

In 1952 the technical appendix to "Marsprojekt", which contained the specifications for the novel's expedition to Mars, was published by Umschau Verlag in Germany as Das Marsprojekt. The following year, the English translation of the appendix was published in the United States by the University of Illinois Press as The Mars Project.

In the late 1950s, This Week, an American syndicated Sunday magazine supplement published excerpts from Mars Project. The magazine focused on von Braun's philosophies on space flight and the future of humanity, rather than the novel's technical details. Apogee Science Fiction, a Canadian publisher of space-related historical science fiction published Mars Project as Project Mars: A Technical Tale in 2006, 57 years after von Braun wrote the novel, and almost thirty years after his death. The book includes eight pages of colored paintings by American science fiction and space illustrator, Chesley Bonestell, who also painted the cover.

In the Author's Preface to Project Mars: A Technical Tale, written by von Braun in 1950 in Fort Bliss, he states that the purpose of the book is to "stimulate interest in space travel". He said that all the book's scientific data is derived from "the results of careful computations or tested scientific observations", which includes the physical characteristics of Mars. Von Braun goes on to say that once his explorers land on the planet, "the solid, scientific platform upon which we have stood sinks beneath our feet and we tread upon the fairy bridge of fantasy". The Martian canals are speculation and the inhabitants are fiction. Von Braun concluded that "readers who may have gagged a bit on the mass of technical detail upon which they fed during the long voyage through space, this part of the story may offer opportunities for ruminative philosophical reflection."

Publication history
The published titles are shown in bold.
1948–1949: Wernher von Braun wrote Marsprojekt, a science fiction novel in German.
1950: Henry J. White translated Marsprojekt into English as Mars Project.
1952: Marsprojekt technical appendix was published in German by Umschau Verlag as Das Marsprojekt.
1953: Mars Project technical appendix was published in English by the University of Illinois Press as The Mars Project.
late 1950s: This Week published excerpts from the unpublished Mars Project novel.
2006: The Mars Project novel was published by Apogee Books as Project Mars: A Technical Tale.

Synopsis
Project Mars: A Technical Tale takes place in 1980, thirty years in the future. The world is governed by the United States of Earth, established after a devastating war in the 1970s between the Western Powers and the Eastern Bloc. The West won the conflict with the aid of Lunetta, an orbiting space station that dropped nuclear missiles on the Soviet Union. Soon after peace is achieved, a reflecting telescope on Lunetta confirms the existence of canals on Mars, vindicating Percival Lowell's assertion that intelligent life exists on the planet. The President orders a mission to Mars to establish just how intelligent the Martians are and whether they pose a threat to Earth.

Lunetta is used as the base from which to launch a ten-spaceship flotilla to Mars. Materials and equipment are ferried from Earth to the space station where the spaceships are constructed and prepared. Von Braun describes in detail the ships' life support systems, and the problems of cosmic rays, weightlessness and boredom. Technical details of the voyage to the red planet are also given, including the necessary mid-course maneuvers. Once in orbit around Mars, three winged landing craft descend to the surface of the planet.

The explorers soon make contact with the Martians. They are humanoid in appearance and live underground. They welcome the earthlings who quickly establish that they are an ancient and benevolent "super-civilization". After establishing verbal communication, the humans learn about the Martians' social structure and their form of government, which is run by ten men under the leadership of "the Elon". The visitors witness technology far superior to their own, including underground transport and organ transplants. They also learn from the Martians their views on ethics and morality, and the responsible use of technology.

Earth, pleased with developments on Mars, decides to establish formal relations between the two planets. They invite three Martians to accompany the explorers on their return trip home. The landing craft on the planet's surface are converted to return to the mother ships in orbit, and the explorers, with their three Martian guests, return to Earth.

Reception
In a review of Project Mars: A Technical Tale at the space and astronomy news website, Universe Today, Mark Mortimer wrote that von Braun's science fiction novel is really "a thinly veiled technical overview of how to travel to Mars." He said it illustrates the rocket scientist's "expectations of interplanetary flight", and considering that in 1949 nothing had been sent into orbit, much of the book is still relevant today. But Mortimer added that it is more than just a technical blueprint. It also deals with the social and philosophical issues surrounding space flight, space exploration and encounters with extraterrestrial life. Mortimer said that while the book does not have "strong plots and vibrant characters", there is plenty to keep the reader interested, and for them to assess how far we have come in fifty years.

Ted Spitzmiller found the novel "interesting reading" because in addition to illustrating von Braun's "passion for space flight", it also reveals his "philosophy on life". Reviewing the book for the National Space Society, Spitzmiller said the author's knowledge of a range of scientific disciplines "is impressive", and he leaves "virtually no technical stone unturned". He did feel, however, that von Braun's need to show that a mission to Mars is possible fills the book with "sometimes tedious" technical detail which "labor[s] the essence of the story line". Spitzmiller also felt that White's translation of von Braun's "Teutonic vocabulary" uses arcane words that may necessitate a dictionary while reading. But overall Spitzmiller described Project Mars as an "enthralling read" and called it "highly recommend[ed]".

The "Elon"
Interest in this novel increased in 2021 when people connected Elon, the Martian leader, to business magnate, Elon Musk, suggesting that von Braun may have predicted Musk's space exploration ventures. "Chapter 24: How Mars is Governed" states:

Notes

References

Works cited

External links

Project Mars: A Technical Tale at Apogee Books

2006 Canadian novels
2006 science fiction novels
Canadian science fiction novels
Novels set on Mars
Human missions to Mars
Space colonization literature
Novels about extraterrestrial life
Wernher von Braun